The Usili Formation is a Late Permian geologic formation in Tanzania. It preserves fossils of many terrestrial vertebrates from the Permian, including temnospondyls, pareiasaurs, therapsids and the archosauromorph Aenigmastropheus.

History of study 
 
One of the first to study rocks of the Usili Formation was British geologist G. M. Stockley. In 1932, Stockley explored the geology of the Ruhuhu Basin in Tanzania. He called a series of layers dating from the Late Carboniferous to the Middle Triassic of the Songea Series and divided it into eight units labelled K1-K8. Stockley was also the first to describe fossils from these rocks, naming an older layer the "Lower Bone Bed" and a younger layer the "Upper Bone Bed".

In 1957, paleontologist Alan J. Charig described many more fossils from the upper bone beds in his Ph.D. thesis for the University of Cambridge. Subsequently, Stockley's units were renamed, Charig (1963) calling unit K6 the Kawinga Formation, K7 the Kingori Sandstones, and K8 the Manda Formation. Fossils were identified in many strata, invalidating Stockley's division into two distinct bone beds. Since Charig's description, the Kawinga Formation has been renamed the Usili Formation, the Kingori Sandstones have become the Kingori Sandstone Member of the Manda Formation, and Charig's original Manda Formation has become a subunit of the formation called the Lifua Member. Six formations and one informal unit are currently recognized in the Songea Group (Ruhuhu basin) rocks range in age from Pennsylvanian to Anisian, including the Idusi (K1), Mchuchuma (K2), Mbuyura (K3), Mhukuru (K4), Ruhuhu (K5), and Usili (K6) formations and the informal Manda Beds, which include the Kingori Sandstone (K7) and Lifua Member (K8).

Since Parrington (1956), the Usili Formation became widely recognized as a Late Permian formation that correlates with the Teekloof and Balfour formations of South Africa, as well as with the Zambian Upper Madumabisa Mudstone (Cistecephalus AZ). Comparison of Usili tetrapods with those of the lower Beaufort Group has suggested a broad biostratigraphic correlation with the Cistecephalus, Dicynodon, and Tropidostoma assemblage zones. Sidor et al. (2010) recognized only one undivided tetrapod faunal assemblage in the Usili Formation, which includes Aenigmastropheus, temnospondyls, pareiasaurs, gorgonopsians, therocephalians, cynodonts, and dicynodonts, whose remains were collected from various localities. This suggests that several therapsid genera have unequal stratigraphic ranges and temporal durations in the Ruhuhu and Karoo basins.

Sidor et al. (2010) and Sidor et al. (2013) noted that it is probable that the Chiweta Beds of Malawi and the Usili Formation of Tanzania represent the same rock unit, separated only by political boundaries and geologic faulting (being located on either side of Lake Nyasa). Except for the burnetiid MAL 240, which is unique to the Chiweta Beds, the Usili Formation hosts identical genera, including Aelurognathus, Dicynodontoides, Rhachiocephalus, Endothiodon cf. E. bathystoma, Oudenodon baini, Gorgonops? dixeyi and an indeterminate tusked dicynodont (SAM-PK-7862, SAM-PK-7863).

Paleobiota

Tetrapods

Temnospondyls

Parareptiles

Eureptiles

Therapsids

Anomodonts

Biarmosuchians

Cynodonts

Therocephalians

Gorgonopsians

References 

Geologic formations of Tanzania
Permian System of Africa
Permian Tanzania
Lopingian geology
Sandstone formations
Conglomerate formations
Siltstone formations
Mudstone formations
Fluvial deposits
Lacustrine deposits
Permian southern paleotemperate deposits
Paleontology in Tanzania
Formations